Lekanesphaera is a genus of Isopod in the family Sphaeromatidae. It was split off from Sphaeroma by Karl Wilhelm Verhoeff, 1943.: The type species is L. monodi (formerly Sphaeroma monodi Arcangeli, 1934). Other well-studied species are L. glabella (Madera), L. rugicauda (Baltic), and L. hookeri (from Scotland and southeast Sweden to Italian lagoons). Because they inhabit intertidal zones such as estuaries, their adaptation to diurnal variations in factors such as salinity are often studied.

Cladogram
Lekanesphaera cladogram from the Catalogue of Life

Lekanesphaera rugicauda

Lekanesphaera rugicauda, also called a "sea slater," is found in estuaries ranging from the Baltic, down to the Netherlands and British Isles, and south to the Bay of Biscay. It is best found in the upper intertidal of brackish waters, such as salt marsh pools, under rocks and wood.

References

References

External links

Sphaeromatidae